Sybra densemarmorata is a species of beetle in the family Cerambycidae. It was described by Breuning in 1942.

References

densemarmorata
Beetles described in 1942